Won Buddhism, is a modern Buddhist religion originating in Korea.  The name "Won Buddhism" comes from the Korean words 원/圓 won ("circle") and 불교/佛敎 bulgyo ("Buddhism"), literally meaning "Round Buddhism" or interpreted as "Consummate Buddhism."  It can be regarded as either a syncretic new religious movement or a reformed Buddhism.  The stated goals of Won Buddhism are for people to realize their own innate buddha nature and to save all sentient beings by serving others.  Emphasis is on interaction with daily life, not “stilling the impulses,” but rather acting in accord with “appropriate desires.”  Won Buddhism's Founder, Sotaesan (Pak Chung-bin, 1891-1943) believed that over-emphasis on the material world in relation to the spiritual world would create undue suffering;  his Founding Motto was, “With this Great Opening of matter, let there be a Great Opening of spirit.”

Founder and early history

Background
Korea does not have a single dominant religion.  Buddhism was introduced to the Korean peninsula in the 4th century CE.  During the Joseon Dynasty (1392-1910), Confucianism became the predominant belief system and Buddhism was repressed.  Christianity, initially Catholicism and later Protestantism, was introduced in the late 19th century.  Under Japanese occupation (1910-1945), Japanese-oriented Buddhism became prominent in part to counter Christianity’s influence.  Concurrently during the late 19th/early 20th centuries, new movements arose in Korean Buddhism to reform its traditional elements or form a “new Buddhism,” e.g., Won Buddhism.

Founding of Won Buddhism
Sotaesan (Pak Chungbin, 박중빈, 朴重彬, 1891–1943) grew up in a poor village in the southwest corner of the Korean peninsula.  His only formal education was two years of local primary schooling, in the Confucian tradition.

According to Won Buddhism tradition, he began asking questions about universal phenomenona at age 7 and expanded his inquiries to problems of life and death and existence.
He began his quest by praying to mountain spirits for four years, following this with equally unsuccessful questioning of those considered enlightened teachers.  Finally, he spent several years in deep observation and contemplation, often in harsh physical conditions.  By the age of 25, he was viewed as a lost soul by his fellow villagers.  On April 28, 1916, he claimed to have experienced enlightenment and entered a state of nirvana. Won Buddhists annually celebrate this date as Great Enlightenment Day.

Sotaesan did not set out specifically to embrace Buddhism.  Rather, after his enlightenment he examined various religions.  His thought contained Confucian and Daoist elements, but after reading the Diamond Sutra he determined that his beliefs aligned most closely with the teachings of the Buddha.

He then attracted a small group of followers and selected nine disciples.  Early guiding principles included diligence, frugality, elimination of formal rituals and superstition, and abstinence from alcohol and smoking  Major elements, still central today, are the lack of a wide distinction between laity and the priesthood, equality of men and women, modernizing practice and doctrine, and concern about the swift rise in material development.   Early on, Sotaesan sought to improve the daily lives of his followers by establishing a thrift and savings institution and embarking on an arduous, year-long levee-building project to reclaim 25 acres of land from the sea for rice cultivation.

In August of 1919, the nine disciples pledged to follow the new movement even at the cost of their lives.  In an event commemorated today as "The Miracle of the Blood Seal," thumbprints placed on a sheet of paper recording their pledge were seen to turn red.

Sotaesan named his community Bulbeop Yeongu Hwe (Society for the Study of the Buddha-dharma) in 1924.  It remained a small rural order based in Iksan, North Jeolla Province, until the Japanese occupation ended in 1945.  Sotaesan’s successor, Chǒngsan (Song Kyu, Cheongsan) renamed it Wǒnbulgyo (Won Buddhism) in 1947.  

Since the end of Japanese occupation in 1945, Won Buddhism has grown markedly.  The precise number of Won Buddhist practitioners worldwide is unclear.  In South Korea’s 2005 census, approximately 130,000 people identified as members.  However, this may be an under-representation, since people could also identify themselves on the census as “Buddhists.”  Won Buddhist Headquarters estimates the number to be over 1 million world-wide.  Currently, there are approximately 500 Won Buddhist temples in Korea and over 70 temples and centers in 23 countries.  This includes 33 in the United States and 2 in Canada.

Doctrine

An early treatise was written by Sotaesan and published in 1935, the Treatise on the Renovation of Korean Buddhism (Hanja: 朝鮮佛敎改革論 Chosǒn Pulgyo Hyǒksillon) and then expanded into The Correct Canon of Buddhism (Pulgyo Chǒngjǒn) in 1943, just before his death. His successor, Chǒngsan, published the new canon in 1962, The Scriptures of Won Buddhism (Wonbulgyo Kyojeon). All were written in Korean to be accessible to as many people as possible.

The Scriptures now also include the Dharma Discourses by the Second Head Dharma Master Chǒngsan and eight traditional Mahayana works, e.g., the Diamond Sutra and Secrets on Cultivating the Mind by the Korean monk and scholar Jinul (1158-1210).

Prominent in every Won Buddhist temple is a large round circle above the altar. This is Il Won Sang, the “One Circle Image.” 

 

In the words of Won Buddhism's fourth Head Dharma Master, “The reason the Buddha is respected and venerated is not his physical body.  The reason is his enlightened mind." Il Won Sang is considered the symbol of the essence of the Buddha’s mind, the Dharmakaya Buddha, representing
 The original source of all beings in the universe
 The mind-seal of all buddhas and sages
 The original nature of all sentient beings

Won Buddhist teachings are summed up in a Doctrinal Chart printed at the front of The Scriptures of Won Buddhism:

Four Principles comprising the doctrine are:
 Awareness of Grace and Requital of Grace
 Right Enlightenment and Right Practice
 Selfless Service to the Public
 Practical Application of the Buddha-dharma

Down the center of the chart is an explication of Il Won Sang and Master Sotaesan's Transmission Verse:  “Being into nonbeing and nonbeing into being,
Turning and turning – in the ultimate,
Being and nonbeing are both void,
Yet this void is complete.”

To the left and the right are two “Gateways” representing the paths of worship and practice, the Gateway of Faith, Based on Retribution and Response of Cause and Effect, and the Gateway of Practice, Based on True Void and Marvelous Existence.

The Gateway of Faith includes:

The Fourfold Grace: Won Buddhists express gratitude to the Fourfold Grace, or Four Beneficences defining what one cannot live without.    These also reflect Confucian values in Won doctrine.  Even Won Buddhists describe their tradition both ways.

Characteristics shared with mainstream Mahayana Buddhist tradition include:
 Belief in karma and reincarnation
 Belief in salvation through enlightenment to the truth that the world’s problems are caused by and can be solved our own minds
 Meditation practice, including core Seon teachings but not as central as in many traditional Buddhist practices
 The goal of saving all sentient beings from suffering

Characteristics distinguishing Won Buddhism include:
 Emphasis on doing beneficial work for others as well progressing internally through practice
 No claim by the Founding Master of Buddhist training or direct transmission of teachings
 Key concepts from non-Buddhist Korean traditions
 The core teaching that spiritual transformation should parallel developments in the material world
 The symbol of Il Won Sang (One Circle Image) vs. images of the Buddha (see also: Aniconism in Buddhism)
 A universalist message that all religions are essentially one

Current practice

Won Buddhist clerics -- women and men -- are called kyomunim (literally “someone devoted to the teaching”).  Unlike traditional Buddhist monks, they do not shave their heads.  The Prime Dharma Master is elected by the Supreme Dharma Council, consisting of senior and lay ministers who also are elected.  

Gender equality is both a core doctrine and an organizing principle.  Female kyomumin have the same status as their male counterparts.  Women as well as men may be elected “masters” and sit on the Supreme Dharma Council, Won Buddhism’s highest decision-making body.  

In past years, a culture developed in which female kyomunim remained celibate and dressed in traditional clothing while celibacy remained optional for male kyomunim, who could also wear contemporary dress.  These differences were controversial.  Female kyomunims have now adopted both traditional and modern clothing, and in 2019 the Supreme Dharma Council passed a resolution ensuring equal marriage access for all ministers.

The Won Buddhist order has formed schools and social welfare centers in Korea and medical missions to other parts of the world. Supporting education is held especially important for the goal of increasing people’s independent self-reliance.  Sotaesan taught that “all religions are of one household although they have different names in accordance with the different times and districts of their foundation” and the importance of inter-faith dialogue has been maintained by Head Dharma Masters since.

Temples offer weekly services, typically on Sundays.  These can include meditation, hymns and chanting, and a dharma talk, similar to a sermon.

References

Citations

Works cited
Adams, Daniel J., "Won Buddhism in Korea:  A New Religious Movement Comes of Age," Transactions of the Royal Asiatic Society -- Korea Branch 84 (2009) 1-35.
Baker, Don, "Constructing Korea's Won Buddhism as a New Religion:  Self-differentiation and Inter-religious Dialogue," International Journal for the Study of New Religions 3:1 (2012) 47-70.
Chung, Bongkil, The Scriptures of Won Buddhism:  A Translation of the WǒngBulgyo Kyojǒn with Introduction.  Honolulu:  Univ. Hawai'i Press, 2003.
Chung, Bongkil, "Sot'aesan's Creation of Won Buddhism through the Reformation of Korean Buddhism," pp. 61-90 in Makers of Modern Korean Buddhism, Park, Jin Y., ed.  Albany:  SUNY Press, 2010.
Clark, Peter, "Won Buddhism," pp. 299-301 in New Religions in Global Perspective.  London:  Routeledge, 2006.
The Dharma Master Chǒngsan of Won Buddhism:  Analects and Writings, transl. Bongkil Chung.  Albany:  SUNY Press, 2012.
The Doctrinal Books of Won-Buddhism (Wonbulgyo Kyosǒ).  Iksan, Republic of Korea:  Department of International Affairs of Won-Buddhist Headquarters, 2016.
Paik, Nak-chung, "Won-Buddhism and a Great Turning in Civilization," Cross-Currents:  East Asian History and Culture Review, E-Journal No. 22 (March 2017).  http://cross-currents. Berkeley.edu/e-journal/issue-22. 
Park, Jin Y., "Won Buddhism, Christianity and Interreligious Dialogue," Journal of Korean Religions 5:1 (2014) 109-131.
Park, Pori, "A Korean Buddhist Response to Modernity.  Manhae Han Yongun's Doctrinal Reinterpretation for His Reformist Thought," pp. 41-59 in Makers of Modern Korean Buddhism, Park, Jin Y., ed.  Albanay:  SUNY Press, 2010.
Pye, Michael, "Won Buddhism as a New Korean Religion," Noumen 49, 2 (2002) 113-141.
"South Korea," The Worldmark Encyclopedia of Religious Practices, 2nd Edition.  Farmington Mills, MI:  Gale, 2014.
Varvaloucas, Emma, "The Grace in This World:  An Interview with Venerable Chwasan, Former Head Dharma Master of the Won Buddhist Order,"  Tricycle Magazine, May 2016.  https://tricycle.org/magazine/the-grace-in-this-world/, 9/20/21.
"Won Buddhism," Encyclopedia of Buddhism, Irons, Edward A., ed.  New York:  Facts on File, 2008.
"Won Buddhism," The Princeton Dictionary of Buddhism, eds. Buswell, Jr., Robert E., & Lopez, Jr., Donald S.  Princeton:  Princeton Univ. Pr., 2014.

Further reading
 Chung, Bongkil. "Won Buddhism: A synthesis of the moral systems of Confucianism and Buddhism", Journal of Chinese philosophy 15 (1988): 425–448.
 McBride, Richard D. "Won Buddhism", in Religions of the World, edited by J. Gordon Melton and Martin Baumann, 3121–3122. Santa Barbara: ABC-CLIO, 2010.
 The Doctrinal Books of Won-Buddhism (Wŏnbulgyo Kyosŏ), Translated by the Committee for the Authorized Translations of Won-Buddhist Scriptures (Iksan: Wonkwang Publishing, 2016).

External links
 Official website
 Won Buddhism

Schools of Buddhism founded in Korea
Buddhist organizations based in South Korea
Buddhist new religious movements
Won Buddhism